Capital Pride, stylized bilingually as Fierté dans la Capital(e) Pride, is the annual Pride event in Canada's National Capital Region, which includes the cities of Ottawa, Ontario and Gatineau, Quebec. It has been held annually since 1986.

Mission
The mission of the Capital Pride organization is to create an environment for advocacy, education, and the fostering of a strong and vibrant Rainbow Community within the Nation's Capital region. It does so through the annual Fierté dans la Capital(e) Pride festival, where it welcomes everyone to participate, celebrate, and experience being a part of the Rainbow Community.

Events are held throughout the year in partnership with other community groups, businesses and sponsors to help educate and promote the issues and interests of the LGBT community, culminating in an entertaining and professional festival at the end of August.

History
Ottawa's first gay pride celebration was a picnic in Strathcona Park in June 1986, attended by about 50 people. In 1989, the pride celebration became a week of activities: dances, exhibits, films, sporting events, and receptions.

In May 1997, the Pride Week Committee was incorporated as the Pride Committee of Ottawa–Gatineau and the festival received their first official proclamation from Ottawa City Council.  In 1998 the Pride Week Committee received a letter of support from Prime Minister Jean Chrétien.

The annual festival was held at Festival Plaza at Ottawa City Hall until 2002, when it was moved to Bank Street. In 2005, the festival was moved from Bank Street back to Festival Plaza and the dates of the festival were changed from July to August. In 2008, the Pride Committee of Ottawa–Gatineau was rebranded as Capital Pride. It has evolved into a citywide 10-day festival of over 20 events, complete with a Pride Parade, Dyke March and other events that appeal to families, athletes, artists and all members of the LGBT community.

In 2010, Pride Week included a rugby match between Canada's only two predominantly gay rugby teams, the Toronto Muddy York and the Ottawa Wolves. The historic match was played on the main lawn of Parliament on August 28, 2010.

In 2014, Capital Pride ran into financial troubles after 'accounting irregularities' kept the organization from paying vendors over $100,000. The organization declared bankruptcy in December 2014. Early in 2015, a new organization, Capital Pride, formed to save the festival and ensure there would be a celebration for the 30th year in Ottawa. The new organization's governance structure consists of the Community Advisory Committee (Board of Directors) which is responsible for overall direction and policies, and the Festival Operations Committee which is responsible for the execution of the annual Fierté dans la Capital(e)Festival.

With the goal of being inclusive, Capital Pride has opted for using the term Rainbow Community to identify members across gender and sexual diversity scales and their allies.

Capital Pride issued a statement in June 2017 that it "supports the participation of individual LGBTQ2 police officers and their allies" in the festival, and made a non-binding request that off-duty Ottawa Police Service officers attending Pride in August to not wear their uniforms or use police vehicles when marching in the parade. The request was the result of consultations with Pride stakeholder groups such as LGBT people of colour, disabled people, Indigenous two-spirited people, and transgender people who frequently have disproportionately negative interactions with police. City councillor Allan Hubley, whose son was openly gay and died by suicide at the age of 15 due to anti-gay bullying, called for the city to withdraw all funding from Capital Pride and expressed concern that Pride was being "bullied by another group" such as Black Lives Matter. Mayor Jim Watson was not supportive of Capital Pride's request but stated he would not withdraw funding. Ottawa police chief Charles Bordeleau, initially opposed to Capital Pride's request and intending to march in full uniform, agreed to march out of uniform with other Ottawa Police Service officers.

Capital Pride announced the appointment of its first-ever executive director, Osmel Guerra Maynes, on January 6, 2020.

In 2020 the community festival was cancelled due to the COVID-19 pandemic in Canada, with organizers instead announcing a plan to proceed with an online "digital pride" festival. The digital festival included a Miss Capital Pride pageant; the winner, Icesis Couture, went on to win the second season of Canada's Drag Race in 2021.

Gallery

References

External links

 
 A queer's history of Ottawa Pride - Capital Xtra!

1986 establishments in Ontario
Festivals established in 1986
Festivals in Ottawa
LGBT culture in Ottawa
Pride parades in Canada
Annual events in Ottawa